Aloísio dos Santos Gonçalves (born 19 June 1988), known as Aloísio or Luo Guofu, is a professional footballer who plays as a striker for América Mineiro. Born in Brazil, he renounced his Brazilian citizenship and gained Chinese nationality in 2020 and represents the China national team.

Club career
Aloísio a.k.a. "Boi Bandido" signed his first professional contract with Grêmio in June 2006 for five years. The club attached a £7.25 million buy-out clause. Aloísio made his full debut in a 2–0 win for Grêmio against São Caetano on October 14, 2006.

In August 2007, he moved to Swiss second division side FC Chiasso on loan for two seasons.

On May 18, 2011, he joined Brazilian Série A club Figueirense on the back of excellent performances at his former team Chapecoense in the Campeonato Catarinense. He scored 14 goals in 19 matches to lead Chapecoense to the Champions Trophy.

On December 1, 2012 Aloisio confirmed that he had signed a pre-contract with São Paulo FC which came with a release cause in case a big European side came in for him. On December 7 the president of São Paulo FC, Juvenal Juvêncio, confirmed Aloísio would be playing for the team in the 2013 season.

On 10 July 2013, Aloísio scored the 1,000th goal in São Paulo's history in the Brazilian League, playing at home in the 1-2 loss against Bahia. In the next game, Aloisio scored a goal with his left hand against Portuguesa de Desportos in a 2-1 loss. A week later, against CR Flamengo, Aloísio repeated the move. On October 27, 2013 Aloísio scored his first hat-trick playing for São Paulo FC in a 3-2 league victory against SC Internacional.

Aloísio joined Chinese Super League side Shandong Luneng in January 2014 for a fee of €5 million. He was the top scorer for the 2015 Chinese Super League season with 22 goals in 28 games. Aloísio transferred to fellow Super League side Hebei China Fortune in July 2016.

On 16 January 2018, Aloísio joined China League One newcomer Meizhou Meixian Techand, signing a two-year contract.

On 8 April 2022, Aloísio signed with Brazilian Club America Mineiro, wearing his Chinese name in Hanyu pinyin style Luo GF on the back of his shirt. In July 2022, his signed shirts were auctioned off on football memorabilia website MatchWornShirt.com.

International career
On 7 September 2021, Aloísio made his international debut in a 0–1 defeat to Japan in the 2022 FIFA World Cup qualification. In his second international match against Saudi Arabia, Aloísio scored a goal and had the opportunity to level the score with 9 minutes before the end of the game, but lost it.

Career statistics

Club

International

Scores and results list China's goal tally first.

Honours

Club 
Grêmio
 Campeonato Gaúcho: 2007

Chapecoense
 Campeonato Catarinense: 2011

São Paulo
 Eusébio Cup: 2013

Shandong Luneng
 Chinese FA Cup: 2014
 Chinese FA Super Cup: 2015

Individual 
 Chinese Super League Golden Boot award: 2015

See also 
List of Chinese naturalized footballers

References

External links
 CBF 

 hattrick 
 FC Chiasso profile

Living people
1988 births
Sportspeople from Santa Catarina (state)
Chinese footballers
China international footballers
Brazilian footballers
Brazilian emigrants to China
Brazilian expatriate footballers
Grêmio Foot-Ball Porto Alegrense players
Associação Chapecoense de Futebol players
Figueirense FC players
São Paulo FC players
América Futebol Clube (MG) players
FC Chiasso players
Shandong Taishan F.C. players
Hebei F.C. players
Guangdong South China Tiger F.C. players
Guangzhou F.C. players
Campeonato Brasileiro Série A players
Chinese Super League players
China League One players
Expatriate footballers in Switzerland
Brazilian expatriate sportspeople in Switzerland
Expatriate footballers in China
Brazilian expatriate sportspeople in China
Association football forwards
Naturalized citizens of the People's Republic of China